Wyld or WYLD may refer to

 Wyld (crater), a lunar crater
 Wyld (World of Darkness), a fictional entity
 Wyld diagrams in fluid mechanics
 Wyld's Great Globe, an attraction of Victorian London
 WYLD (AM), a radio station (940 AM) licensed to New Orleans, Louisiana, United States
 WYLD-FM, a radio station (98.5 FM) licensed to New Orleans, Louisiana, United States
 A typeface in the Caslon family

 Surname

 Carlos Wyld Ospina (1891–1956), Guatemalan novelist, essayist and poet
 Evie Wyld (born 1980), Anglo-Australian author
 Harry Wyld (1900–1976), British track cyclist
 Henry Cecil Kennedy Wyld (1870–1945), English lexicographer and philologist.
 James Hart Wyld (1913–1953), American engineer and rocketry scientist.
 Lew Wyld (1905–1974), British track cyclist 
 Percy Wyld (1907–1972), British track cyclist
 William Wyld (1806-1889), British artist

See also 
 Wild (disambiguation)
 Wylde (disambiguation)